Omphalomancy is a method of divination meant to determine the number of children a mother may have, based on the belief that the shape of the navel can reveal this information. This is most commonly done with newborn infants, by noting the markings on the newborn's navel.

Divination